Paraxestocis is a genus of tree-fungus beetles in the family Ciidae.

Species
 Paraxestocis unicornis Miyatake, 1954

References

Ciidae genera